Roadmender may refer to:

 The Roadmender, a 1902 Christian spiritual book by Margaret Barber
 Roadmender (nightclub), a nightclub and concert venue in Northampton